Djoièzi is a village on the island of Mohéli in the Comoros. According to the 1991 census, the village had a population of 1,636. It is the birthplace of former Comorian president, Ikililou Dhoinine.

References

Populated places in Mohéli